Donna Deitch (born June 8, 1945, San Francisco, California) is an American film and television director, producer, and writer best known for her 1985 film Desert Hearts. The movie was the first feature film to depict a lesbian love story in a generally mainstream vein, with positive and respectful themes.

Career
Donna Deitch segued from award-winning documentary filmmaker to producing and directing Desert Hearts, the landmark hit of the 1985 Telluride and Toronto International film festivals, and the 1986 Sundance Film Festival. The film was picked up for worldwide distribution by The Samuel Goldwyn Company. Shortly after seeing the film, Oprah Winfrey hired Deitch to direct the Emmy-nominated four-hour miniseries The Women of Brewster Place.

Deitch directed four pilots after the success of Brewster Place, three of which were picked up for series, including Second Noah. She has directed numerous episodes of one-hour dramas including NYPD Blue, ER, Murder One, Law and Order: SVU, EZ Streets, The Visitor, Dragnet, Crossing Jordan, Heroes, Private Practice, and others. She directed the pilot episode of The N's, South of Nowhere.

She directed Prison Stories: Women on the Inside for HBO; Showtime's The Devil's Arithmetic starring Kirsten Dunst and Brittany Murphy, and Common Ground, written by Terrence McNally, Paula Vogel, and Harvey Fierstein (also for Showtime).

Deitch directed, photographed, and edited Angel On My Shoulder, a feature-length documentary about the experience of her best friend, actress Gwen Welles (Nashville), dying of cancer. The film won the Gold Hugo for Best Documentary at the 1998 Chicago International Film Festival.

In a 2008 interview, she said she was working on obtaining financing for "Blonde Ghost", a recently completed screenplay adapted from Stella, the 1992 non-fiction book by Peter Wyden about Stella Goldschlag, which takes place in Berlin during World War II. That same year, Deitch said that she was writing a sequel to Desert Hearts which would be set "in NYC in the late 60s".

Personal life
Deitch is openly lesbian. Her partner is writer Terri Jentz.

Filmography

Films

Television

Actor

Accolades

See also 
 List of female film and television directors
 List of lesbian filmmakers
 List of LGBT-related films directed by women

References

External links
 
 
  Donna Deitch Blog (archived March 8, 2012)
  'Angel On My Shoulder' (Documentary Feature) at Donna Deitch website (archived May 17, 2010)

1945 births
Living people
21st-century American women artists
21st-century American LGBT people
American documentary filmmakers
American television directors
American women film directors
American women screenwriters
American women television directors
American lesbian artists
LGBT film directors
LGBT film producers
LGBT television directors
LGBT television producers
American LGBT screenwriters
American women documentary filmmakers
LGBT people from California
Screenwriters from California
Film directors from San Francisco
UCLA Film School alumni